Alec E. Gores (born 1953) is an American billionaire businessman who began making his fortune through leveraged buyouts of technology firms at the firm The Gores Group. He has also been instrumental in popularizing SPACs, beginning in the mid-2010s.

Early life 
Alec Gores was born in 1953 in Nazareth, Israel, from a Catholic family, the son of a Greek father and a Lebanese mother. His family of eight moved to Flint, Michigan in November 1968 when he was 15 years old with just $40 and two suitcases to their name. He began working the very next day at his uncle's store in Flint, bagging groceries for 25 cents an hour. He attended Genesee High School in Genesee, Michigan. He obtained a degree in computer science from Western Michigan University, and was the first in his family to attend college. He is the older brother of Tom Gores, founder of Platinum Equity, and Sam Gores, the head of Paradigm Talent Agency.

Career
Upon graduating college, Gores landed a position at General Motors. Within six months, he decided he couldn’t work in a large corporation and quit, striking out on his own to build a company that bought and distributed computers. With the help of his father’s last $8,000, Gores founded Executive Business Systems in 1978, selling computers out of his parents' basement. By 1986 the company employed over 200 people and was acquired by CONTEL for approximately $2 million.

Following the acquisition, Gores began acquiring and operating non-core businesses from major corporations. He eventually founded The Gores Group, a private equity firm in 1987 and since then has acquired or invested in over 130 companies spanning 35 years. Gores pioneered the operational approach to private equity investing, initially deploying his own personal capital, followed by ~$4 billion of institutional capital across multiple investment vehicles. Marquee investments during this time included the carve-out of The Learning Company from Mattel; Verifone from HP; Therakos from Johnson & Johnson; Lineage, which ultimately sold to GE; and Sagemcom, which evolved into one of France’s premier technology companies.

Gores and his brother Tom have been involved in a number of deals together including the 2011 acquisition of Alliance Entertainment, which distributes DVDs, CDs and video games to stores such as Barnes & Noble, Amazon.com and Target.

In 2020, Forbes ranked Gores No. 391 on the Forbes 400 list of America's wealthiest people. He was selected as 2021 Business Person of the Year by LA Business Journal. Gores has also been profiled in The Wall Street Journal.

SPACs 
Beginning in 2015, Gores launched a new platform specializing in Special Purpose Acquisition Companies (SPACs), launching Gores Holdings, and Gores and The Gores Group are credited with starting the SPAC revival with their first SPAC transaction in Hostess. Gores is considered one of the most prolific investors in the SPAC space, having created 13 SPACs, more than any other single investor, and The Gores Group is considered a premier SPAC sponsor.

Gores has announced or completed more than seven SPAC transactions to date representing over $36 billion in transaction value.

 Hostess – consumer, maker of Twinkies. Partnered with Apollo and Dean Metropoulos 
 Verra – technology mobility services business. Instrumental for safety, specializing in red light cameras, school bus safety, and tolling
 PAE – government logistics services business with large government contracts
 Luminar Technologies – first high growth, technology company. Leader in the automotive Lidar space. Partnered with founder, Austin Russell
 United Wholesale Mortgage (UWM) – mortgage tech business. Largest SPAC transaction to date
 Matterport – 3D spatial data company revolutionizing the real estate tech space
 Ardagh Metal Packaging (AMP) – metal packaging for consumer products. Largest SPAC spin out of public company. Merger with Gores Holdings V, raising almost $1 billion in gross proceeds
 Sonder – a leading next-generation hospitality company. Merger with Gores Metropoulos II
 Polestar – a global premium EV company. Signed definitive agreement to be publicly listed through combination with Gores Guggenheim, Inc. Resulted in an implied enterprise value of $20 billion
 Footprint – global materials science technology company focused on sustainable solutions, most notably packaging for the food and beverage industry. As of December 2021, the company was scheduled to be publicly listed on NASDAQ through combination with Gores Holdings VIII, Inc.

Gores launched Gores Holdings VII and Gores Holdings VIII in 2021, and publicly filed for Gores Technology Partners and Gores Technology Partners II, as well as Gores Guggenheim, the latter in partnership with Guggenheim Partners.

Personal life
As of 2009, Gores is a practicing Catholic.

Gores has six children. He is married to Kelly Noonan-Gores, producer and director of the award-winning documentary HEAL. He has a former wife, Lisa.

See also 
 List of largest houses in the Los Angeles Metropolitan Area

References

Living people
American billionaires
American computer businesspeople
American financiers
American investors
American people of Greek descent
American people of Lebanese descent
American technology company founders
American technology chief executives
American venture capitalists
Israeli emigrants to the United States
Israeli people of Greek descent
Israeli people of Lebanese descent
People from Flint, Michigan
People from Nazareth
Western Michigan University alumni
1953 births
Catholics from Michigan